Barbro Lönnkvist (born 22 June 1959) is a Swedish orienteering competitor. She became a Relay World Champion in 1981 as a member of the Swedish winning team, together with team members Arja Hannus, Karin Rabe and Annichen Kringstad.

Lönnkvist was placed first at the Swedish 5-day O-Ringen event in Sundsvall in 1988, and again in Östersund in 1989.

References

Living people
Swedish orienteers
Female orienteers
Foot orienteers
World Orienteering Championships medalists
1959 births